The art of paper cutting in China may date back to the 2nd century CE, when paper was invented by Cai Lun, a court official of the Eastern Han Dynasty.

As paper became more affordable, paper-cutting became one of the most important types of Chinese folk art. Later, this art form spread to other parts of the world, with different regions adopting their own cultural styles. Because the cut-outs are often used to decorate doors and windows, they are sometimes referred to as "window flowers"  or "window paper-cuts". These cut-paper decorations are often glued to the exterior of windows, so the light from the inside shines through the negative space of the cutout. Usually, the artworks are made of red paper, as red is associated with festivities and luck in Chinese culture, but other colours are also used. Normally cut-paper artwork is used on festivals such as Chinese New Year, weddings and childbirth, as cut-paper artwork is considered to symbolize luck and happiness.

Origin

Chinese paper-cutting originated from the practice of worship of both ancestors and gods, a traditional part of Chinese culture dating back roughly two millennia. According to archaeological records, paper-cutting originates from the 6th century, although some believe that its history could be traced back as far as the Warring States period (around 3 BC), long before paper was invented. At that time, people used other thin materials, like leaves, silver foil, silk and even leather, to carve negative-space patterns. Later, when paper was invented, people realized that this material was easy to cut, store and discard, and paper became the major material for this type of artwork.

During the Ming and Qing dynasties (1368–1912), this artistry witnessed its most prosperous period. For over a thousand years, people (mainly women) created cut-paper artworks as a leisure activity, creating different types of paper-cutting and passing this traditional craft onto their children, resulting in the artform becoming more popular. Paper-cutting is still practiced as an artform in modern-day China as a result.

As a material, paper mildews and rots easily. In the southeast of China, where it typically rains in May and June, this causes paper to mildew and rot especially quickly; as a result, people in the southeast typically did not engage in paper-cutting art, making it hard to find cut-paper artworks from previous centuries. In contrast, the weather in the northwest of China is usually dry, making it possible to find cut-paper art made in the Northern dynasties in Turpan, Sinkiang province.

Paper-cutting as an artform matured during the Tang dynasty, where it became considered not only a type of handicraft, but also a type of artwork, as ideas and concepts were expressed through the pattern cut into the paper. In the Ming and Qing dynasty, paper-cutting reached a developmental peak. Folk paper-cutting spread to a wider range of people, and expressed an abundance of artistic expression. Paper-cutting was used to decorate doors, windows and walls, to show happiness and celebrate festivals.

Classification
Paper-cutting is one of the oldest and the most popular folk arts in China. It can be geographically divided into a southern and a northern style. The southern style, represented by works from Yangzhou in Jiangsu Province and Yueqing in Zhejiang Province, features ingenious and beautiful designs, exquisite carving and interesting shapes. The northern style, mainly from Yuxian and Fengning in Hebei Province, and best represented by works from northern Shaanxi, features exaggerated shapes, vigorousness, vivid depictions and diverse patterns.

Cut-paper art designed for windows is usually cut in a freeform manner, except for the flower pattern found in the corner. The theme of cut-paper window decorations varies widely, the most popular of which are based on the stories of traditional Chinese opera. As cut-paper window decorations are typically bought by farmers, the content of their designs usually describes farming, spinning, fishing and poultry farming.

Symmetry

Designs for cut-paper works vary, from basic designs consisting of a single image, to symmetrical designs, formed by folding the paper into proportional sections before a shape is cut out, so that when unfolded, it forms a symmetrical design. Chinese cut-paper artworks are typically of the symmetrical variety, and are usually folded into an even number, such as twice or four times.

Uses
Today, paper cuttings are chiefly decorative. They liven up walls, windows, doors, columns, mirrors, lamps and lanterns in homes and are also used on presents or are given as gifts themselves. Paper cut-outs pasted on or near entrances are supposed to bring good luck. Paper cuttings used to be used as patterns, especially for embroidery and lacquer work. Cut-paper artworks are used by young people as a decoration for their kits and books.

Paper-cutting was and is mostly used as a decoration, or an aesthetic way to express people's hopes, gratitude and other emotions. The vivid designs depicting on paper-cuttings have different meanings. Some express wishes for a harvest or a wealthy life, shown through the imagery of a golden harvest, thriving domestic animals and plants, as well as good fortunes, a carp jumping over a dragon gate (a traditional Chinese story, indicating a leap towards a better life), polecats, lions, kylins (a mythical Chinese creature), jade rabbits (an animal taken from Chinese legend), pomegranates and peonies. Other designs feature legendary figures, or scenes from traditional myths or stories, such as designs of the Yellow Emperor, the meeting of Cowherd() and Weaver Girl(), and the 24 stories of filial pietry. Designs may also show people's gratitude towards life, such as paper-cuttings of a doll with two twisted hairs on each side of the head, or fish swimming through lotus plants.

Window paper-cuttings have a close relationship with the beginning of spring, and it is traditional to decorate windows with paper-cuttings to welcome spring. In many areas of China, especially in the north, paper-cuttings are pasted to windows to express happiness for the new season, a tradition that has been practiced since the Song and Yuan dynasties.

Construction
There are two methods of manufacturing Chinese paper-cuttings: one method uses scissors, the other a sharp knife. In the scissor method, several pieces of paper - up to eight - are fastened together, before the motif is then cut with sharp, pointed scissors.

In the knife method, several layers of paper are placed on a relatively soft foundation, consisting of a mixture of tallow and ashes. Following a pattern, the motifs are then cut into the paper with a sharp knife, which is usually held vertically. Skilled artisans can cut different designs freehand, without following a pattern.

See also
Chinese art
Chinese folk art
Chinese paper folding
Kirigami
Leaf carving
Papercutting
Scherenschnitte
Wycinanki
Papel picado

References

Bibliography
Zhang Shuxian. Chinese Folk Paper-cutting[J]. China Today (Chinese version), 2005,(05)
Zhuang Zhiyun. Folk Paper-cutting[J]. Chuang Zuo Ping Tan, 2006,(02)

External links

Paper art
Paper art
Intangible Cultural Heritage of Humanity
Paper art
Papermaking in China